Grevillea annulifera, also known as prickly plume grevillea, is a species of flowering plant in the family Proteaceae and is endemic to northern Western Australia. It is a spreading to erect shrub with pinnatisect leaves with five to nine sharply-pointed, linear lobes, and cream-coloured to pale yellow flowers.

Description

Taxonomy
Grevillea annulifera was first formally described in 1864 by botanist Ferdinand von Mueller in his Fragmenta Phytographiae Australiae, based on plant material collected near the Murchison River by Augustus Oldfield. The specific epithet (annulifera) means "ring-bearing", referring to the shape of a gland at the base of the style.

Distribution and habitat
Prickly plume grevillea grows in sandy soil in heath and mallee shrubland near the lower reaches of the Murchison River in the Gascoyne region from around Shark Bay in the north down to around Chapman Valley in the south, in the Geraldton Sandplains and Yalgoo biogeographic regions of Western Australia.

Conservation status
This grevillea is listed as "not threatened" by the Government of Western Australia Department of Biodiversity, Conservation and Attractions.

References

annulifera
Endemic flora of Western Australia
Eudicots of Western Australia
Proteales of Australia
Taxa named by Ferdinand von Mueller
Plants described in 1864